Ueli Mülli is a Swiss curler.

Teams

References

External links
 

Silver Broom, Perth, 1975 - Curling History
Dank verlorener Wette zum ersten WM-Titel - News - 20 Minuten

Living people
Swiss male curlers
World curling champions
Swiss curling champions
Year of birth missing (living people)